SSSF may refer to:

School Sisters of St. Francis - an education-oriented organization associated with nuns of the Catholic Church
Stoosbahn - a funicular in Switzerland
Swedish Shooting Sport Foundation, affiliated with the Swedish Home Guard
Stockholm Academic Male Chorus (Swedish: Stockholms Studentsångarförbund)